This is a list of awards and nominations received by Sistar, a South Korean girl group formed in 2010 by Starship Entertainment.


Awards and nominations

Other accolades

State and cultural honors

Listicles

Notes

References

Awards
Sistar